Mirny is an urban locality (an urban-type settlement) in Krasnoyarsky District of Samara Oblast, Russia. Population:

References

Urban-type settlements in Samara Oblast